Wadi Al-Habali is a sub-district located in al-Saddah District, Ibb Governorate, Yemen. Wadi Al-Habali had a population of 4964 according to the 2004 census.

References 

Sub-districts in As Saddah District